"Big Machine" is a song by the Goo Goo Dolls, first released on their Gutterflower album in 2002. It was written by lead vocalist/guitarist Johnny Rzeznik, who calls it his "disco song" and describes its meaning as "a propulsive tale of unrequited love". This song's drums were on a drum machine, and it was called "Disco". This song was written about the people in LA, and the way of life, as told on VH1's Storytellers.

Track listings
U.S. promo CD
"Big Machine" - 3:10
Australian CD single
"Big Machine" - 3:10
"Black Balloon" - 4:01
"Broadway" - 3:50

Live versions

The song was performed live as the opener for the band's Independence Day concert, and was filmed for the Live in Buffalo: July 4th, 2004 DVD release.

Chart positions

References

2002 singles
Goo Goo Dolls songs
Songs written by John Rzeznik
Song recordings produced by Rob Cavallo
Torch songs